Octavius Edward Coope JP DL (12 January 1814 – 27 November 1886) was an English brewing partner and Conservative Member of Parliament 1847–1848 and 1874–1886.

Coope, born 12 January 1814, was the son of John Coope of Great Cumberland Place, London, and his wife Anna Maria. In 1845 Coope and his brother George joined the brewer Edward Ind to form the brewery company of Ind Coope which was based at Romford.

In 1847 Coope was elected as Member of Parliament for Great Yarmouth; the next seat he was unseated on the proven bribery of some of his electors. His main homes were Rochetts in South Weald, Essex, 41 Upper Brook Street, London, and Berechurch Hall. He helped to endow the church of St. Paul, Bentley Common, and Crescent Road Infants' School, South Weald. He was a director of the Phoenix Fire and the Pelican Life Insurance Cos and a J.P. and Deputy Lieutenant for Essex.

Coope was next elected as MP for Middlesex in 1874. On 14 February 1881 he laid the foundation-stone for a new church at Brentwood. He held the Middlesex seat until 1885 when the constituency was reorganised. In 1885, he was elected as MP for Brentford, but died 27 November 1886 at the age of 72; his epitaph reads The memory of the just is blessed. Coope married Emily Fulcher daughter of Captain Fulcher, of the Indian Army in 1848. She was buried with Coope. Coope died at the age of 72 and his grave is toward the south-west corner of South Weald's churchyard.

References

External links

1814 births
1886 deaths
Conservative Party (UK) MPs for English constituencies
UK MPs 1847–1852
UK MPs 1874–1880
UK MPs 1880–1885
UK MPs 1885–1886
Politics of the Borough of Great Yarmouth